Biellese, meaning of or relating to the town of Biella, may also refer to:

 The Biellese, the area of or Province of Biella
 The Biellese breed of sheep
 A.S.D. Junior Biellese Libertas, a football club in Biella